Neophyte II (secular name Neofit Gianoglu, ; January 1, 1787, Bucharest – January 14, 1850, Bucharest) was Metropolitan of Ungro-Wallachia (1840-1849), and a participant in the Wallachian Revolution of 1848.

Biography 
In 1818 he was ordained Hierodeacon, on  March 29, 1824 Hieromonk and on April 5, 1824 Archimandrite. He became Abbot of the Sfântul Gheorghe Nou Monastery in Bucharest, was elected Bishop of Râmnicu on April 18, 1824, and on April 20 he was ordained Bishop by Gregory IV, the Teacher, Metropolitan of Ungro-Wallachia.

He agreed to be vicar of the Metropolitanate from February 1829 to August 22, 1833, while Gregory IV was exiled in Russia and also after his death on June 22, between 1834 and 1840. From June 29, 1840 to July 27, 1849, he was officially appointed Metropolitan of Ungro-Wallachia.

In 1831 he became a member of the Extraordinary Public Revision Assembly and was appointed president of the Royal Divan.

During the Wallachian Revolution of 1848 (July-September 1848), he was invited by the Revolutionary Committee to become Chairman of the Provisional Government, which he accepted on July 12. He fiercely opposed the reform plans of radicals within the government, such as Nicolae Bălcescu. He eventually turned against the Provisional Government, but his coup d'état failed and he was replaced on August 9, 1848 by a radical triumvirate consisting of Ion Heliade Rădulescu, Nicolae Golescu and Christian Tell.

After the suppression of the Revolution he requested (as Metropolitan) the restoration of order and contributed to the capture of clerics who had engaged in revolutionary actions, which led to him being considered a controversial figure from 1848. On July 27, 1849 he retired from the metropolitan seat.

As a metropolitan, he set up four theological seminaries in Wallachia and supported sending young people to scholarships in Greece and Russia.

Sources 
 the article in the Romanian Wikipedia, Neofit al II-lea.''

1787 births
1850 deaths
Romanian Orthodox metropolitan bishops
Clergy from Bucharest
People of the Revolutions of 1848